The Royal Swans are a flock of swans of two species—the mute swan (Cygnus olor) and the black swan (C. atratus)—the original six pairs of which were a gift to the city of Ottawa from Queen Elizabeth II in 1967, to commemorate the Canadian Centennial. Since then, the number of Royal Swans has increased to the point that they now occupy the waters of the Rideau River between Carleton University and Cummings Bridge.

See also
 Canadian royal symbols
 Swan upping

References

Monarchy in Canada
Swans
Animals as diplomatic gifts